In the study of stochastic processes in mathematics, a hitting time (or first hit time) is the first time at which a given process "hits" a given subset of the state space. Exit times and return times are also examples of hitting times.

Definitions

Let  be an ordered index set such as the natural numbers,  the non-negative real numbers, or a subset of these; elements  can be thought of as "times". Given a probability space  and a measurable state space , let  be a stochastic process, and let  be a measurable subset of the state space . Then the first hit time  is the random variable defined by

The first return time is defined to be the first hit time for the singleton set  which is usually a given deterministic element of the state space, such as the origin of the coordinate system.

Examples

 Any stopping time is a hitting time for a properly chosen process and target set. This follows from the converse of the Début theorem (Fischer, 2013).
 Let  denote standard Brownian motion on the real line  starting at the origin. Then the hitting time  satisfies the measurability requirements to be a stopping time for every Borel measurable set 
 For  as above, let  denote the first exit time for the interval , i.e. the first hit time for  Then the expected value and variance of  satisfy

 For  as above, the time of hitting a single point (different from the starting point 0) has the Lévy distribution.

Début theorem

The Début theorem says that the hitting time of a measurable set , for a progressively measurable process, is a stopping time. Progressively measurable processes include, in particular, all right and left-continuous adapted processes.
The proof that the début is measurable is rather involved and involves properties of analytic sets. The theorem requires the underlying probability space to be complete or, at least, universally complete.

The converse of the Début theorem states that every stopping time defined with respect to a filtration over a real-valued time index can be represented by a hitting time. In particular, for essentially any such stopping time there exists an adapted, non-increasing process with càdlàg (RCLL) paths that takes the values 0 and 1 only, such that the hitting time of the set  by this process is the considered stopping time. The proof is very simple.

See also
Stopping time

References

Stochastic processes